Zardi is a surname. Notable people with the surname include:

 Dominique Zardi (1930–2009), French actor
 Luciano Zardi (born 1930), Italian weightlifter

See also
 Lardi
 Zardi's